Carabus viatorum, is a species of ground beetle in the large genus Carabus.

References 

viatorum
Insects described in 1992